Suphi Nuri İleri (1887, Gallipoli – 1945, Istanbul) was a Turkish politician and writer.

He was the brother of Celâl Nuri İleri. Their mother was Nefise Hanım, the eldest daughter of the Ottoman Albanian statesman Prevezeli Abidin Pasha, who served as Adana governor, Bahr-i Sefit (Aegean Islands) Governor and Minister of Foreign Affairs. Together in 1918 they founded the Turkish nationalist magazine İleri.

In 1936 he produced the Turkish translation of Karl Marx's Capital: Critique of Political Economy.

References 

1887 births
1945 deaths
People from Gelibolu
20th-century Turkish politicians
Turkish writers
Istanbul University Faculty of Law alumni